Triviella sanctispiritus is a species of gastropods belonging to the family Triviidae.

The species inhabits marine environments.

References

Triviidae